Františkov nad Ploučnicí is a municipality and village in Děčín District in the Ústí nad Labem Region of the Czech Republic. It has about 400 inhabitants. It lies on the Ploučnice River.

Administrative parts
The hamlet of Mlatce is an administrative part of Františkov nad Ploučnicí.

References

Villages in Děčín District